Cuisine in Mali includes rice and millet as staples of Mali, a food culture heavily based on cereal grains. Grains are generally prepared with sauces made from edible leaves, such as spinach, sweet potato or baobab, with tomato peanut sauce. The dishes may be accompanied by pieces of grilled meat (typically chicken, mutton, beef, or goat).

Malian cuisine varies regionally. Part of West African cuisine, other popular dishes in Mali include fufu, Jollof rice, and maafe (peanut butter sauce).

References

 
West African cuisine